Christopher Paul Seager (born 5 April 1951) is a former Zimbabwean cricketer. Seager was a right-handed batsman.  He was born at Salisbury, Southern Rhodesia (today Harare, Zimbabwe).

Seager made his debut in English county cricket for Berkshire in the 1970 Minor Counties Championship against Cornwall.  He made three further appearances for the county, all coming in that season's competition.  While attending the University of Cambridge, Seager made his first-class debut for Cambridge University Cricket Club against Leicestershire in 1970.  He made seven further first-class appearances for the university, all of which came in the same season.  In his eight first-class appearances, he scored a total of 104 runs at an average of 10.40, with a high score of 23.

His brother, Michael, was also a first-class cricketer.

References

External links
Christopher Seager at ESPNcricinfo
Christopher Seager at CricketArchive

1951 births
Living people
Sportspeople from Harare
Zimbabwean people of British descent
White Rhodesian people
Alumni of the University of Cambridge
Zimbabwean cricketers
Berkshire cricketers
Cambridge University cricketers